"Nevertheless, she persisted" is an expression adopted by the feminist movement, especially in the United States. It became popular in 2017 after the United States Senate voted to require Senator Elizabeth Warren to stop speaking during the confirmation of Senator Jeff Sessions as U.S. Attorney General. Senate Majority Leader Mitch McConnell made this remark during his comments following the vote.

The expression went viral as feminists posted it on social media with hashtag references to other women. Its meaning has expanded to refer more broadly to women's persistence in breaking barriers, despite being silenced or ignored.

Background

Senate debate on confirmation of Jeff Sessions 

On February 7, 2017, the U.S. Senate debated confirmation of Senator Jeff Sessions of Alabama to become Attorney General. Senator Elizabeth Warren of Massachusetts spoke against confirmation, criticizing his record on civil rights.

Senator Warren quoted a statement from 1986 by former Senator Ted Kennedy regarding Senator Sessions' nomination to federal court judge, "He is, I believe, a disgrace to the Justice Department, and he should withdraw his nomination and resign his position." Senator Warren said she "will stand with Senator Kennedy, and, like he did, I will cast my vote against the nomination of Senator Sessions."

Senator Warren continued by reading a letter that Coretta Scott King had written to the Senate Judiciary Committee in 1986:

Senate Rule XIX 

While Senator Warren was reading the letter from Mrs. King, Presiding Senate Chair Steve Daines of Montana interrupted her, reminding her of Senate Rule XIX, which prohibits ascribing "to another senator or to other senators any conduct or motive unworthy or unbecoming a senator".

Senator Warren stated that she had said that only former Senator Kennedy had called Senator Sessions a disgrace, and she asked whether reading King's letter, which had been admitted into the Senate Record in 1986, was a violation of Senate Rules. Senator Daines again quoted Rule XIX. Senator Warren asked to continue reading Mrs. King's letter, and Senator Daines allowed her to do so.

McConnell's objection 

While Senator Warren continued reading the letter, Senate Majority Leader Mitch McConnell of Kentucky interrupted, saying, "The senator has impugned the motives and conduct of our colleague from Alabama, as warned by the chair." Senator McConnell objected to a line from Ms. King's letter, "Mr. Sessions has used the awesome power of his office to chill the free exercise of the vote by black citizens", which Senator Warren had quoted prior to the warning.

Senator Warren said she was "surprised that the words of Coretta Scott King are not suitable for debate in the United States Senate" and requested to continue. Senator Daines asked whether there was objection. Senator McConnell objected, and Senator Daines called for a vote, saying, "The senator will take her seat", preventing Senator Warren from continuing. The Senate voted to sustain McConnell's objection along party lines, 49–43, silencing Warren for the duration of the Sessions confirmation hearings.

Thirty hours remained in the hearings, and Democrats objected to Senator Warren's silencing. Senator Jeff Merkley of Oregon subsequently read the letter from Coretta Scott King without objection. Senator Cory Booker of New Jersey pointed out that the letter was already in the 1986 Congressional Record.

After the vote 

Following the Senate ruling to silence Senator Warren, Senator McConnell said on the Senate floor:

Reactions

Rallying cry 

Feminists and supporters of Senator Warren immediately adopted as a rallying cry the three-word sentence, "Nevertheless, she persisted." It has been referenced with hashtags such as "#Shepersisted", and "#LetLizspeak", and it has been called a "hashtag-ready motto for women at the ready to break barriers". According to BuzzFeed, the quotation was shared on social media along with pictures of strong women "who refused to be silenced". Amy Wang of The Washington Post observed,

CNN reported, "For Warren's supporters, it was a textbook case of mansplaining followed by males silencing a woman".

On National Public Radio's All Things Considered, Scott Detrow said that "Nevertheless, she persisted" had become the new "nasty woman", which had become a rallying cry derived from Donald Trump's description of Hillary Clinton in 2016.

Megan Garber of The Atlantic wrote that "Nevertheless, she persisted" appeared on the internet next to "images not just of Warren and King, but also of Harriet Tubman, Malala Yousafzai, Beyoncé, Emmeline Pankhurst, Gabby Giffords, Michelle Obama, Hillary Clinton, and Princess Leia. It accompanied tags that celebrated #TheResistance". Hillary Clinton tweeted, "She was warned. She was given an explanation. Nevertheless, she persisted. So must we all." It also appeared on merchandise: Reebok produced tee shirts with the expression and gave the proceeds to the Women's March. Hoodies and mugs with the meme were also produced. Salon reported women getting tattoos of the three words, more than 100 women in Minneapolis alone.

On June 7, 2017, Senator Warren tweeted support for Senator Kamala Harris using the "Nevertheless She Persisted" hashtag, after Harris was admonished for interrupting Deputy Attorney General Rod Rosenstein during a hearing.

In 2018, the Women's History Month theme in the United States was "Nevertheless, She Persisted: Honoring Women Who Fight All Forms of Discrimination against Women", intentionally referring to the "Nevertheless, she persisted" remark by Mitch McConnell.

Criticism 
Others were less favorably inclined toward the expression and its application to Warren. Charlotte Allen of The Weekly Standard suggested that #Shepersisted was yet another tactic in the marketing of Warren as a possible presidential candidate, describing it as "Red meat for Warren's supporters, who promptly cried sexism and compared her to Rosa Parks in her refusal to move to the back of the bus, and also to Marie Curie, who never gave up on her quest to discover radium. Within hours entrepreneurs were grinding out 'Nevertheless, she persisted' T-shirts in every size and color".

The incident was also discussed in the context of Senator Warren's possible presidential candidacy by the National Reviews David Harsanyi, who referred to Rule XIX as "an arbitrary, speech-inhibiting rule that should not be used". Stating that "it was unlikely any persuadable voter would have even heard about Warren's grandstanding if it weren't for the kerfuffle", he suggested that the "fuss" (including popularity of the hashtags "#ShePersisted" and "#LetLizspeak") was indicative of a Democratic tendency to "rely heavily on the identity politics that have failed them for six years, if not longer".

Also in the National Review, Alexandra Desanctis wrote that McConnell's remark was "inviting endless inappropriate comparisons between Warren and female political activists from around the world". Desanctis continued:

Gretel Kaufman of The Christian Science Monitor noted that some Democrats used the hashtag #LetLizSpeak to call Senator McConnell's remarks sexist and that the video of Senator Warren reading the full letter was widely viewed on social media. Raising concerns that the incident was "an example of partisanship getting in the way of productive debate", Kaufman quoted Republican Senator Orrin Hatch of Utah, as saying, "All of us need to take stock and need to start thinking about the people on the other side of the aisle and need to start thinking about how we might bring each other together."

Broader themes 

Some observers posited non-political reasons for the meme's proliferation. According to Daniel Victor of The New York Times, "A broader theme—that women are too commonly shushed or ignored—emerged on social media." Victor also noted that "a man silencing a woman struck some as all too common", and "rang familiar with many women who had their own stories of being silenced." The Atlantics Megan Garber wrote, "American culture tells women to be quiet—many ways they are reminded that they would really be so much more pleasing if they would just smile a little more, or talk a little less, or work a little harder to be pliant and agreeable." Further, she wrote, when Senator Warren was silenced, "many women, regardless of their politics or place ... felt that silencing, viscerally ... Because, regardless of their politics or place, those women have heard the same thing, or a version of it, many times before."

Heidi Stevens of the Chicago Tribune commented, "Three little words that women can draw on for decades to come, when something needs to be said and, darn it, we plan to say it. When we're being talked over in meetings. When we're fighting to be heard in male-dominated fields. When we're standing up for our values. When we're doing valuable work and people reduce us to our appearance."

Valerie Schultz wrote in America: the Jesuit Review of Faith & Culture, "It is a phrase we women embrace because persistence is what we do." After describing stories of persistent women from the Gospels, she concluded:

Cultural references 
In March 2017, Chelsea Clinton announced she had written a picture book for children about 13 inspirational American women, titled She Persisted. Clinton's book was adapted into a musical by playwright Adam Tobin and composer Deborah Wicks La Puma that premiered at Bay Area Children's Theatre in February 2019. An Off Broadway production premiered at the Atlantic Theater Company in February 2020.
In the Agents of S.H.I.E.L.D. season 4 episode "No Regrets" (aired April 18, 2017), Leo Fitz reported that a woman was being tortured but had stayed true to her cause, saying "Beaten within an inch of her life ... nevertheless, she persisted."
The second-season finale of Supergirl (aired May 22, 2017) is titled "Nevertheless, She Persisted".
In July 2017, independent Abraham Lincoln researcher Kerry Ellard published a blog article entitled Mary Todd Lincoln's Fight For Her Pension, in which the Introduction section was entitled "Nevertheless, She Persisted".
An ebook anthology called Nevertheless, She Persisted was released by the Book View Café cooperative in August 2017.  The anthology contains stories of female empowerment.
The comic Doonesbury for Sunday, March 3, 2019, makes a reference to the incident.
In 2019, the English National Ballet, based in London premiered a new program of works all created by women entitled She Persisted.
In 2021, Applause Theatre Books, a division of Rowman and Littlefield, published She Persisted: Thirty Ten-Minute Plays by Women over Forty and She Persisted: One Hundred Monologues from Plays by Women over Forty, anthologies of theater writings by members of "Honor Roll!", an advocacy group of women playwrights over forty.

See also 
 List of United States political catchphrases

References

External links 

 Elizabeth Warren's full speech opposing Jeff Sessions' appointment (Video, 50:24. Confrontation with Daines begins at 23:25; confrontation with McConnell begins at 49:18.)
 Elizabeth Warren reads Coretta Scott King letter (Video, 15:29)

115th United States Congress
American political catchphrases
Articles containing video clips
Coretta Scott King
Elizabeth Warren
English phrases
February 2017 events in the United States
Feminism in the United States
Hashtags
Internet memes introduced in 2017
Mitch McConnell
Political Internet memes
Political quotes
United States Senate